Meis, also known as Meis of Illiana, was a department store based in Terre Haute, Indiana, United States. Existing from 1928 to 1989, the chain operated 11 stores at its peak. At the time it was sold to Elder-Beerman there were 10 stores. The Plaza North store in Terre Haute had already closed.

History
Lucien Meis and Salo Levite founded the Meis department store in downtown Terre Haute, Indiana, in 1928. This store remained open until the late 1970s. Meis also operated other stores in Terre Haute at Honey Creek Mall, Plaza North, and The Meadows. The chain also operated a jeans store called The Bottom Half. Both of these businesses were sold to Brown Shoe Company (now Caleres) in 1972.

Stores also operated in Anderson, Kokomo, Marion, and Elkhart, Indiana; Carbondale, Danville, and Mattoon, Illinois; and Paducah, Kentucky.

Brown Group sold the Meis chain, then consisting of ten stores, to Elder-Beerman in 1989.

References

Defunct department stores based in Indiana
1928 establishments in Indiana
1989 disestablishments in Indiana
Defunct companies based in Indiana